Sarıyer  (also called Sarıyar) is a village in Erdemli district of Mersin Province, Turkey. At  it is  situated in the peneplane area to the south of Toros Mountains. The population of Sarıyar was 640 . as of 2012. There are historical ruins around the village . But the settlement was founded by the Yörüks (once-nomadic Turkmens from Alanya, west). Up to 1950 it was a part of Dağlı a village to the northeast of Sarıyer. Then it gained its legal entity as a village. Its original name was Sarıyar (literally "yellow cliff") referring to cliffs on both sides of the village. Main economic activity is farming. Tomato is the main crop. Citrus, locust bean and olive are also produced. Beehiving is another profitable activity.

References

Villages in Erdemli District